Balashikha is a city in Moscow Oblast, Russia, located on the Pekhorka River  east of the Moscow Ring Road. Population:

Etymology
In Finno-Ugric languages, Bala-shika means land of celebrations, land of laughter and fun. Finnic peoples lived in this area before Slavs.

Geography
The city is known for its unique river and waterway system.

History
Balashikha was established in 1830. It was granted town status in 1939. Several rural hamlets had existed long before on the site of the modern city.

The city stands on the famous Vladimir Highway, which led out of Moscow to the east. This was the route along which convicted criminals were marched to forced labor camps in Siberia. The road was renamed Gorky Highway in the Soviet era. The failure of the Decembrist Revolt against Tsar Nicholas I led to the execution of its ringleaders and the exile of many nobles to Siberia. Soviet-era schoolchildren were told that the prisoners were marched in chains along this road followed by their wives. In truth, the Decembrist prisoners were sent from St. Petersburg, then the capital of Russia, through Yaroslavl, and not through Moscow and Balashikha, and the story was invented as part of celebrations of the 100th anniversary of the event in 1925.

Between 1830 and 1870, a cotton factory was in operation in the area, with its fabric called Balashikha. A railway station was built at the end of the 19th century, again called Balashikha Station.

As it grew, Balashikha absorbed other villages, including Gorenki, a suburban estate of Count Andreas Razumovsky, and Pekhra-Yakovlevskoye, an estate of Prince Galitzine, the latter being in use for 250 years from 1591 to 1828. This is the site of a stone church, built from 1777 to 1782.

Saltykovka, a part of Balashikha, has long been known for its attractions to the artistic community. Isaak Levitan, the famous landscape painter, lived there in 1879. Lev Tolstoy was another frequent visitor.

Soviet period
Several institutions were founded in Balashikha after the October Revolution, including one dedicated to the production of fur.

During the Soviet era, Balashikha became a major industrial center with industries in metallurgy, aviation industry, cryogenic technology, machinery, and other fields.

Balashikha sent many of its sons to the front to fight the Germans during World War II. Among those who fought and died was Ivan Flerov who commanded a Katyusha rocket division and is remembered by several monuments and museums in the area.

Along with many other Russian Orthodox Churches, the Cathedral of Saint Alexander Nevsky was demolished by the government. The Cathedral was blown up in the 1960s but was rebuilt, on its original site, in 2002.

Modernity
The Balashikha Maternity House was designated on July 1, 2003, to be the Moscow Oblast Perinatal Center. This facility will now function as a regional perinatal care facility for high-risk mothers and infants and a perinatal health education center for Moscow Oblast.

Although not part of the extensive Moscow subway system, Balashikha is home to many office workers who commute to Moscow each day.  It has several thriving markets and retail centers and is quickly modernizing.  It is surrounded by attractive woodland and countryside.

In January 2015, the city of Zheleznodorozhny was abolished with its territory merged into Balashikha.

Administrative and municipal status
Within the framework of administrative divisions, it is, together with twelve rural localities, incorporated as Balashikha City Under Oblast Jurisdiction—an administrative unit with the status equal to that of the districts. As a municipal division, Balashikha City Under Oblast Jurisdiction is incorporated as Balashikha Urban Okrug.

In the past, Balashikha served as the administrative center of Balashikhinsky District. On January 1, 2011, the district was abolished.

Sport
The 2017 national rink bandy cup took place in Balashikha.

Culture

The city is home to several music schools, including the Sviridov School of Arts. Attractions include the Balashikha Arena and Moscow Radio Center 13.

Military
Balashikha is the site of a large Russian Army base and was closed to foreigners during the Soviet era, a ban which, in theory, remains to the present day. It was the headquarters of the 1st Corps of the Soviet Air Defense Forces and is now to become the headquarters of the Operational-Strategic Command for Missile-Space Defense. Balashikha is also a base for ODON (Internal security division). Balashikha is home to Military Unit 35690, which is a training facility used by the Federal Security Service.

Notable people
Yuri Lyapkin (born 1945), ice hockey player
Nikolay Baskov, tenor singer
Dmitry Klokov, Honored Master of Sports in weightlifting
Andrey Kuznetsov, tennis player
Artyom Avanesyan, Armenian footballer

Twin towns – sister cities

Balashikha is twinned with:
 Martin, Slovakia
 Pernik, Bulgaria
 Yangzhou, China

References

Notes

Sources

Further reading
"Balashikha in stories" (Балашиха в очерках и зарисовках) - А. Галанин и др.

External links

Official website of Balashikha 
Directory of organizations in Balashikha 

Cities and towns in Moscow Oblast
Populated places established in 1830